Bif Naked is the first album by singer-songwriter Bif Naked, released in 1994. The album was originally released through Bif Naked's own label, Concrete. The album was later picked up by Aquarius Records, remixed, and re-released in 1996.

Track listing
"Everything" (Bif Naked/John R. Dexter) – 4:08
"Make Like a Tree" (Bif Naked/Harry Degen/Lionel Misomali/Doug Plavin) – 4:16
"Daddy's Getting Married" (Bif Naked/John R. Dexter) – 3:42
"Tell on You ("Letter to My Rapist")" (Bif Naked/John R. Dexter) – 2:28
"Never Alone" (Bif Naked/John R. Dexter) – 3:57
"Over You" (Bif Naked/Harry Degen/Lionel Misomali/Doug Plavin) – 4:27
"Succulent" (Bif Naked/John R. Dexter) – 3:50
"My Whole Life" (Bif Naked) – 4:12
"The Letter" (Bif Naked/Brad McGiveron) – 5:06
"My Bike" (Bif Naked/Brad McGiveron) – 4:37
"The Gross Gross Man" (Bif Naked) – 1:21

Credits 
Bif Naked – vocals
Russ Klyne – guitar
Niko Quintal – drums
Todd Simko – guitar
John Webster – keyboards
Jerry Wong – guitar
Rich Priske – bass

Production
Producer – John R. Dexter
Engineer – Drexel Molière
Assistant engineers – Zach Blackstone, Rod Michaels
Mixing – Drexel Molière

References

Bif Naked albums
1994 debut albums